Mohammed Hafez Ismail, sometimes spelt Muhammad Hafiz Ismail Arabic: محمد حافظ إسماعيل known as Hafez Ismail,  (October 28, 1919 – January 1, 1997) was an Egyptian "statesman beyond rank", whose four decade career included military, foreign service and intelligence roles, making his "life read like a foreign policy history of contemporary Egypt".

After graduating from military schools in Egypt and Britain in 1939, Ismail led an Egyptian unit in the Second World War close to Egypt's border with Italian occupied Libya, and was stationed in Arish and Rafah in the Arab-Israeli War in 1948–49.

Ismail would then take on staff roles, starting as deputy Military attaché to Washington in 1951. After the July 1952 Revolution which established the republic and independence from Britain, he was appointed as Director of the Bureau of the Commander in Chief, Abdel Hakim Amer, where between 1953 and 1960 he was entrusted with rebuilding a post-colonial military, leading secret delegations to the Soviet Union, the more famous of which was the 1955 Egyptian-Czechoslovak arms deal. Ismail also liaised with Syrian military leaders during the Tripartite Aggression against Egypt in 1956, and facilitated the merger of Syrian and Egyptian troops in the lead up to the formation between them of the United Arab Republic in 1958.

In 1960, Hafez Ismail retired from the military and was made deputy at the Ministry of Foreign Affairs and given the task of modernizing it, before being posted as ambassador to London, Paris, Dublin and Rome between 1963 and 1970.

His career took another shift in 1970, this time to intelligence when President Gamal Abdel Nasser appointed him director of the General Intelligence Directorate in the wake of the 1967 defeat from Israel in the Six Day War. A year later he became National Security Adviser (1971-1974) for Nasser's successor Anwar Sadat, and Presidential Chief of Staff (1973), conducting secret talks with the US in the lead up to the October War that saw Egypt retake the Sinai. After falling out with Sadat who was ignoring his consul, Ismail rejoined the foreign service where he was posted to Moscow and later Paris before reaching retirement in 1979.

Hafez Ismail spent his later years writing and lecturing, while holding an honorary post as director of the General Intelligence think tank, the Republican Center for Strategic and Security Studies.

Writings 
Amn Misr al-Qawmi fi ‘asr al-Tahadiyyat [Egyptian National Security in an Era of Challenges] (in Arabic). Cairo: Dar al-Ahram li-L-Tarjama, 1987.

‘an al-Diplomasiya wal-Harb [On Diplomacy and War]. al-Ahaly, February 16, 1994.

Siyasat Misr al-Kharijiya fi ‘aqd al-Thamaninat (Egypt's Foreign Policy in the 1980s]. al-ahram, October 21, 1991.

Dirasa Jadida: Maza Yajri fi-l-Itihad al-Sovieti? [New Study: What is Happening in the Soviet Union?]. Al-Gomhuriya, August 14, 1988.

References

1919 births
1997 deaths
Ambassadors of Egypt to the United Kingdom
Ambassadors of Egypt to France
Ambassadors of Egypt to Italy
Ambassadors of Egypt to the Soviet Union
Directors of the General Intelligence Directorate (Egypt)
Egyptian expatriates in the United Kingdom